The 1966 Cal State Los Angeles Diablos football team represented California State College at Los Angeles—now known as California State University, Los Angeles—as a member of the California Collegiate Athletic Association (CCAA) during the 1966 NCAA College Division football season. Led by first-year head coach Jim Williams, Cal State Los Angeles compiled an overall record of 4–6 with a mark of 2–3 in conference play, tying for fourth place in the CCAA. The Diablos played home games at the Rose Bowl in Pasadena, California.

Schedule

Team players in the NFL
The following Cal State Los Angeles players were selected in the 1967 NFL Draft.

References

Cal State Los Angeles
Cal State Los Angeles Diablos football seasons
Cal State Los Angeles Diablos football